Romanogobio banaticus is a species of cyprinid fish endemic to Romania.

References

Romanogobio
Fish described in 1960
Taxa named by Petre Mihai Bănărescu